Jae-shin is a Korean unisex given name. Its meaning depends on the hanja used to write each syllable of the name. There are 20 hanja with the reading "jae" and 25 hanja with the reading "shin" on the South Korean government's official list of hanja which may be registered for use in given names.

People with this name include:
Lee Jae-shin, South Korean male taekwondo practitioner, silver medalist in Taekwondo at the 2002 Asian Games – Men's 72 kg 
Kim Jae-shin (born 1973), South Korean male football manager 

Fictional characters with this name include:
Jae-sin, male character in 2007 South Korean film Our Town
Moon Jae-shin, male character in 2010 South Korean television series Sungkyunkwan Scandal
Lee Jae-shin, female character in 2012 South Korean television series The King 2 Hearts
Yoo Jae-shin, male character in 2016-2017 South Korean television series Guardian: The Lonely and Great God

See also
List of Korean given names

References

Korean unisex given names